Lausanne railway station is the main intercity and regional railway station for the city of Lausanne, Vaud, Switzerland. It is often known as Lausanne CFF to distinguish it from others in the town.

Description

Lausanne is a through station, which sits at the junction of the Simplon, Lausanne–Bern, and Lausanne–Geneva railway lines. Due to this, express passenger trains are available to a wide variety of destinations across the country.

Passenger trains are primarily run by Swiss Federal Railways (SBB CFF FFS), with additional international trains run by companies from neighbouring France (TGV Lyria).

There is also a network of local services from Lausanne, primarily as part of the RER Vaud, and platforms for line 2 of the Lausanne Métro. The metro station, Lausanne-Gare, was opened on 27 October 2008.

Passenger facilities include Bureau de change, left luggage and lost property offices.

Developments
Significant improvements are planned for the station by 2020. A third subway is to be constructed for platform access, along with longer platforms to allow larger trains. A new tunnel is also to be built for the Lausanne Métro directly underneath the Renens (West) end of the main line station, with new métro platforms directly connected to the subway, removing the need for some métro passengers to cross the square in front of the station.

Services
 the following services call at Lausanne:
 InterRegio:
 RegioExpress:
On weekends, hourly service to Geneva Airport.
 RER Vaud:

PRODES EA 2035 
As part of the strategic development program for rail infrastructure (PRODES), the Confederation and SBB are focusing on customer orientation and economical management of resources.

By 2040, nearly two million people will travel by rail every day, 50% more than today. In rail freight, the Confederation also expects traffic to increase by around 45%. The Swiss rail network will have to continue to meet customer needs: interesting connections, punctual trains, affordable tickets. SBB is committed to the sustainable development of public transport and takes on this responsibility vis-à-vis Switzerland.

Predicted Services 

 TGV Lyria: 
 Eurocity: 
 InterCity:
 IC1: Hourly service between Geneva Airport and Romanshorn.
 IC11 (Sister Line): Hourly service between Geneva Airport and Lucerne.
 IC5: Half-hourly service between Geneva Airport and St. Gallen, with every other train continuing to St. Margrethen.
 IC9: Half-hourly service between Geneva Airport and Brig.
 InterRegio:
 IR18: Hourly service between Annemasse and Bern.
 IR95: Half-Hourly between Geneva Airport and St-Maurice.
 IR98: Hourly service between Annemasse and Aigle.
 RER Vaud:
 : Half-hourly service between Grandson and Aigle.
 : Half-hourly service between Cully and Vallorbe, with every other train continuing to Le Brassus.
 : Half-hourly service between Allaman and Payerne, with every other train continuing to Murten/Morat.
: Half-hourly service to Palézieux.
 : Hourly service to Orbe

Gallery

See also
 History of rail transport in Switzerland
 Rail transport in Switzerland

References

External links

Lausanne railway station – SBB
Interactive station plan (Lausanne)

Railway stations in the canton of Vaud
Swiss Federal Railways stations
Transport in Lausanne
Railway stations in Switzerland opened in 1856